This is a list of all field hockey players who have captained Indian national men's and women's field hockey team at the international level in Olympics. The list includes all Indian captains since the period of 1928 Olympics in Amsterdam.

Men's

Women's

References

External links
 Olympic Captains Of India

Captains
Field hockey
Olympic medalists in field hockey
Lists of field hockey players
Lists of Olympic gold medalists
Field hockey
Olympic captains
Sports captains